Kyzyl is the capital city of the Tuva Republic, Russia.

Kyzyl may also refer to:

Kyzyl Airport, an airport in the Tuva Republic, Russia
Kyzyl mine, a gold mine in Kazakhstan
Kyzyl Caves, Buddhist caves in Xinjiang, China

See also 
 
 
 Kizil (disambiguation)